Lycosa tarantula is the species originally known as the tarantula, a name that nowadays in English commonly refers to spiders in another family entirely, the Theraphosidae. It now may be better called the tarantula wolf spider, being in the wolf spider family, the Lycosidae. L. tarantula is a large species found in southern Europe, especially in the Apulia region of Italy and near the city of Taranto, from which it gets its name.

Historical superstition has it that the spider's bite can produce severe symptoms called tarantism.

Description
These spiders are rather large, the females being as large as 30 mm (1.18 in) in body length  and the males around 19 mm (0.75 in). As with other wolf spiders, the silken sac containing over 100 eggs is carried attached to the mother's spinnerets, and then after they hatch, the spiderlings climb on their mother's abdomen and ride around with her for some time until they are sufficiently mature to survive on their own.  After leaving their mother's protection, the young spiders disperse and dig burrows. Females live in their burrows all their lives except for nocturnal forays to capture prey, but the mature males leave the protection of burrows and wander about looking for mates. The males can live for 2 years. The females can live for 4 years or more. Many sexual encounters (about one-third according to one study) end in the female's cannibalising the male instead. During the winter, these spiders hibernate in their burrows.

They are a nocturnal species and generally lurk at the mouths of their burrows waiting for prey, so people are unlikely to encounter them. Unlike the Salticidae (jumping spiders), which may exhibit curiosity about humans and may be content to wander around on one's hand, the Lycosidae (wolf spiders) have a very strong tendency to flee at the approach of any large animal. They have quite good eyesight, so a human likely cannot approach them unseen, and  capturing them is relatively difficult because they keep moving and can run very fast.  When wolf spiders are cornered, they show no inclination to make threat displays, much less to advance on a human's hand with the intention of biting.

Taxonomy
The species was first described by Carl Linnaeus in 1758 (as Aranea tarantula). It was transferred to the genus Lycosa by Pierre André Latreille in 1806. Charles Athanase Walckenaer in the same 1806 publication described the subspecies narbonensis, which in 1837 he raised to a full species as Lycosa narbonensis. A molecular phylogenetic study in 2013 showed that specimens assigned to this taxon were not genetically different from Lycosa tarantula, so that L. narbonensis is now treated as synonym of L. tarantula.

Tarantism

A once-traditional belief among Apulian peasantry is that a person bitten by one of these spiders must be treated by indulging in a special kind of dancing. The dance, or some version of it, is now known as the tarantella. However, the bites of this spider are not known to cause severe symptoms in humans, much less endanger human life.

Venom

In common with all other spiders (except the Uloboridae) L. tarantula possesses venom, which is important to the spider as a means to kill its prey, and secondarily, to protect itself. Evolutionarily, the venoms were tailored for subduing insect prey, and mammal species can have vastly different reactions to the same spider venom. L. tarantula will rarely bite, unless continually provoked, and its venom is not particularly toxic to human beings, and is no more painful than the sting of a bee. Fabre, however, did demonstrate that an artificially administered tarantula bite can kill small mammals and birds.

Given the low toxicity of wolf spider bites and the small likelihood of actually being bitten, medical research efforts have not been directed toward the bites of L. tarantula.

Subspecies
 L. t. carsica Caporiacco, 1949 — Italy
 L. t. cisalpina Simon, 1937 — France

References

Further reading
 John Crompton, The Life of the Spider, Mentor, 1954. pp. 56–57.

External links

Spiders described in 1758
Taxa named by Carl Linnaeus
Spiders of Europe
Lycosidae